Paulina Lake is one of the twin crater lakes in Newberry Crater, central Oregon, United States (the other being East Lake). The lake's primary inflow is seepage from East Lake, snow melt, and hot springs, and its outflow is Paulina Creek, a tributary of the Little Deschutes River. It is about  lower and one mile west of its twin, East Lake.

Paulina Lake sits within the Newberry Crater, formed from over 500,000 years of volcanic activity.

The lake bears the name of Paulina, a Snake Indian.

Recreational Activities

Paulina Lake supports a number of recreational activities, including camping, hiking, fishing, kayaking, canoeing and paddle-boarding.  A 10 mph speed limit on the lake prohibits motorized high speed watersports such as waterskiing and jet skis, which protects the lake as a popular fishing destination.

Once devoid of fish, the lake is now regularly stocked by the Oregon Department of Fish and Wildlife, and is known for its large number of kokanee salmon and brown trout. Other fish found in the lake include rainbow trout, tui chub, and blue chub.  The largest brown trout caught on record in the State of Oregon – a whopping 28 lb., 5 oz. fish – was caught at Paulina in 2002, eclipsing previous records set at the same lake.

See also
List of lakes in Oregon

References

External links

  Atlas of Oregon Lakes Online:Paulina Lake (Deschuttes)

Lakes of Oregon
Lakes of Deschutes County, Oregon
Newberry National Volcanic Monument
Protected areas of Deschutes County, Oregon